Ikhlasgarh or Ikhlas Garh is a village located in district of Gujrat, Pakistan.

References

Villages in Gujrat District